Petite Rivière is a river in Nova Scotia, Canada entirely within Lunenburg County. It is fed by numerous lakes, and a portion of the watershed is the drinking water supply for the town of Bridgewater.

Three of the lakes on Petite Rivière (Hebb, Millipisigate, and Minamkeak) are the only known habitat of the Atlantic Whitefish. Through damming of the lakes, some of the water that once fed the Medway River now flows through the Petite Rivière system. There was a water aerodrome at Fancy Lake.

Samuel de Champlain is said to have given the river its name after landing near the mouth during the early 17th century. The river lends its name to the small community of Petite Riviere, which was at one time known as Petite Riviere Bridge.

See also
List of rivers of Nova Scotia

References 
 Watershed brochure

Rivers of Nova Scotia
Landforms of Lunenburg County, Nova Scotia